Reggie Brown (born January 13, 1981) is a former American football wide receiver. He was drafted by the Philadelphia Eagles in the second round of the 2005 NFL Draft. He played college football at The University of Georgia.

Brown was also a member of the Tampa Bay Buccaneers. He is the cousin of former New York Jets player and a current University of West Georgia defensive backs coach, Jamie Henderson (also a Carrollton High School graduate).

Early years
Brown was a Parade All-American wide receiver at Carrollton High School, while leading the Trojans to back-to-back state championship berths and a 1998 Georgia High School Association Class AA title.

College career
In college at the University of Georgia, Brown was highly touted receiver coming into his freshman year, but injuries held him back during his four years of college. He was the number three receiver in his freshman and sophomore years behind Terrence Edwards and Fred Gibson. During his junior and senior years, Brown was a top performer with Gibson.

Statistics

Professional career

Philadelphia Eagles

Brown was drafted by the Philadelphia Eagles in the second round of the 2005 NFL Draft.

In 2005, his rookie season, Brown was promoted to the starting spot of suspended wide receiver Terrell Owens.  In his first start on November 6, 2005, Brown caught five passes for 94 yards and one touchdown against the Washington Redskins. In his second meeting against the division-rival Redskins, he caught two first half touchdowns.  This impressive performance capped a promising year for the rookie.  Brown led all rookies with 571 yards and was second with 43 receptions.

With the off-season departures of Owens and Todd Pinkston, Brown became the number-one wideout for the Eagles in 2006. He had nearly 18 yards per catch on 816 receiving yards and eight touchdowns for the year.

On November 9, 2006, Brown agreed to a 6-year contract extension with the Eagles. The deal, which locked him up through 2014, was worth up to $27 million, with $10 million in guarantees.

On December 16, 2007, during a game in Dallas against the rival Cowboys, Brown, after running to catch an overthrown pass, ran out of bounds and jumped in the giant Salvation Army bucket in Texas Stadium, saying he couldn't slow down in time to stop before it. He caught the lone touchdown in the Eagles 10–6 win that day.

In the 2008 season, Brown was often injured and eventually lost his starting job to rookie DeSean Jackson. He also fell behind slot receiver Jason Avant and receiver Kevin Curtis on the depth chart. He was inactive in the NFC Championship Game loss at the Arizona Cardinals.

In the 2009 season, Brown produced only 9 catches for 155 yards and no touchdowns. He only started in one game (due to Jeremy Maclin being inactive with a leg injury), in which he caught only one pass for 7 yards. He was inactive for the first two games of the season, and completely fell behind Desean Jackson, Jeremy Maclin and Jason Avant as the team's fourth receiver.

Tampa Bay Buccaneers
On March 8, 2010, Brown was traded to the Tampa Bay Buccaneers for a sixth round pick in the 2011 NFL Draft. He was released on September 6, 2010.

References

External links
Philadelphia Eagles bio

1981 births
Living people
People from Carrollton, Georgia
Sportspeople from the Atlanta metropolitan area
Players of American football from Georgia (U.S. state)
American football wide receivers
Georgia Bulldogs football players
Philadelphia Eagles players
Tampa Bay Buccaneers players